Kerry Howley (born 1981) is a feature writer at New York Magazine, a professor at the University of Iowa's Nonfiction Writing Program, and a screenwriter. She is the author of the critically acclaimed nonfiction novel, Thrown (2014).

Life 
Howley graduated from Georgetown University and the University of Iowa's nonfiction MFA Program.
Prior to working at New York, She was an editor at Reason magazine.  Her work has appeared in New York magazine, The Paris Review, The New Yorker, and Granta.

Howley is the author of Thrown, which was named a New York Times Notable Book, a New York Times Editor's Choice, and a best book of 2014 in Slate, Salon, Playboy, and Time. Thrown was long-listed for the PEN/ESPN Award for Literary Sportswriting and won first prize in the Next Generation Indie Book Awards.

Howley has been named a Lannan Foundation Fellow. Both her 2018 New York cover story on disgraced doctor Larry Nassar  and her 2021 New York essay on January 6 were nominated for Best Feature at the National Magazine Awards. 

In 2022 filming began on Winner, a film scripted by Howley based on the life of Reality Winner. It is directed by Susanna Fogel and starring Emilia Jones.

Works

Books

Essays

 "Call Me a Traitor" New York. 20 July 2021. 
 "Tulsi Gabbard Had a Very Strange Childhood" New York. 11 June 2019.
 "How Did Larry Nassar Deceive So Many for So Long?" 19 November 2018.

Interviews

References

External links 
 http://www.bookslut.com/features/2015_03_021145.php
 Kerry Howley discusses her book, Thrown at Politics and Prose, 23 November 2014

1981 births
Living people
University of Iowa alumni
University of Iowa faculty
Georgetown University alumni
21st-century American women writers
American women academics